Osmani Martín Hernández (born 9 January 1969) is a Cuban former rower. He competed in the men's lightweight double sculls event at the 2000 Summer Olympics.

Notes

References

External links
 

1979 births
Living people
Cuban male rowers
Olympic rowers of Cuba
Rowers at the 2000 Summer Olympics
Place of birth missing (living people)
Pan American Games medalists in rowing
Pan American Games gold medalists for Cuba
Pan American Games silver medalists for Cuba
Rowers at the 1991 Pan American Games
Rowers at the 1995 Pan American Games
Rowers at the 1999 Pan American Games
Medalists at the 1987 Pan American Games
Medalists at the 1991 Pan American Games
Medalists at the 1995 Pan American Games
Medalists at the 1999 Pan American Games